The People's Armed Forces Maritime Militia (PAFMM) is the government funded maritime militia of China. For reportedly operating in the South China Sea without clear identification, they are sometimes referred to as the "little blue men", a term coined by Andrew S. Erickson of the Naval War College in reference to Russia's "little green men" during its 2014 annexation of Crimea.

The armed fishing fleet are part of China's power projection, and are deployed to seize territory and to target anyone who challenges China's claims to the entire South China Sea. In 2016, 230 fishing boats swarmed the same islands.

History
The PAFMM was established after the Chinese Communist Party (CCP) won the Chinese Civil War and forced the KMT to flee the mainland to Taiwan. The newly consolidated communist government needed to augment their maritime defenses against the nationalist forces, which had retreated offshore and remained entrenched on a number of coastal islands. Therefore, the concept of people's war was applied to the sea with fishermen and other nautical laborers being drafted into a maritime militia. The nationalists had maintained a maritime militia during their time in power, but the communist government preferred to craft theirs anew given their suspicion of organizations created by the nationalists. The CCP also instituted a national level maritime militia command to unite the local militias, something the KMT had never done. In the early 1950s, the Bureau of Aquatic Products played a key role in institutionalizing and strengthening the maritime militia as it collectivized local fisheries. Bureau of Aquatic Products leaders were also generally former high ranking PLAN officers which lead to close relations between the organizations. The formation of the PAFMM was influenced by the Soviet "Young School" of military theory, which emphasized coastal defense over naval power projection for nascent communist powers.

In the 1960s and 1970s, the PLAN established maritime militia schools near the three main fleet headquarters of Qingdao, Shanghai, and Guangzhou. Through the first half of the 1970s, the maritime militia mostly stayed near shore and close to China. However, by the later 1970s, the maritime militia had evolved an important sovereignty support function which brought it into increasing conflict with China's neighbors, especially in the South China Sea. The PAFMM contributed significantly to the Battle of the Paracel Islands, especially in providing amphibious lift capacity to Chinese forces. These early PAFMM successes have led to their use in nearly every maritime operation undertaken by the China Coast Guard and Navy, often harassing vessels from neighboring states.

The maritime militia is believed to be behind a number of incidents in the South China Sea where high powered lasers were pointed at the cockpits of aircraft. This includes an attack against a Royal Australian Navy helicopter. 

In 2019, the United States issued a warning to China over aggressive and unsafe action by their Coast Guard and maritime militia.

In August 2020, more than 100 fishing boats approached the Japanese-administered Senkaku Islands.

Equipment
Most vessels are issued with navigation and communication equipment while some are also issued small arms. Some PLAFMM units are equipped with naval mine and anti-aircraft weapons. 

The communications systems can be used both for communication and espionage. Often fishermen supply their own vessels, however, there are also core contingents of the maritime militia who operate vessels fitted out for militia work instead of fishing; these vessels feature reinforced bows for ramming and high powered water cannons. The increasing sophistication of militia vessels' communication equipment is a double-edged sword for Chinese authorities. New equipment, as well as training in its use, has substantially improved command, control, and coordination of militia units. However, the vessels' resulting professionalism and sophisticated maneuvers make them more identifiable as government-sponsored actors, dampening their ability to function as a gray-zone force. Such improvements also potentially make militia vessels more threatening during at-sea confrontations, raising the risk of unintended escalations with foreign militaries. 

The PAFMM has utilized rented fishing vessels and purpose-built ships in its operations.

Capabilities
According to research from the Taiwanese Institute for National Defense and Security Research, China's maritime militia is part of their “grey zone" tactics which are used to wage conflict against China's neighbors without crossing the threshold into conventional war. The maritime militia is a particularly useful gray zone force because Chinese authorities can deny or claim affiliation with its members depending on context. China can send its militia to harass foreign vessels in contested areas, but publicly assert that the vessels are independent from government control, thus avoiding escalation with other states. At the same time, if militia members are hurt during confrontations with foreign vessels, the Chinese government can claim the need to "defend" its own fishermen, mobilizing domestic nationalism to improve its bargaining position in a crisis. 

According to a Congressional Research Service report, the PAFMM and coast guard are deployed more regularly than the PLAN in maritime sovereignty-assertion operations.

See also
 Cabbage tactics
 Chinese salami slicing theory
 Fishing industry in China
 Territorial disputes in the South China Sea
 Mutiny on Lurongyu 2682
 Little green men (Russo-Ukrainian War)

References

External links
China’s ‘fishermen’ mercenaries - Jason Thomas

Military of the People's Republic of China
Militias in Asia
Paramilitary organizations based in China